César Saúl Huerta Varela (born 3 December 2000), also known as El Chino, is a Mexican professional footballer who plays as a forward and winger for Liga MX club UNAM.

Club career
Huerta first joined Guadalajara's youth academy in 2015. Huerta made his Liga MX debut on 10 November 2018 against León, coming on as a substitute in 1–0 win.

He briefly joined second tier club Atlético Zacatepec on loan for the 2018–19 season.

He joined Monarcas Morelia on loan for 2020. He sported squad number 1, a number typically used by goalkeepers. He joined Mazatlán F.C., established in June 2020 after the Monarcas Morelia franchise announced that it would be moving to the city of Mazatlán, Sinaloa.

On 27 July Mazatlán played their first official match, in which they were defeated against Club Puebla with a score of 1–4: in which he scored the club's first official goal. On 11 December it was announced he would be returning to play with Guadalajara for the Guard1anes 2021 tournament.

International career
Huerta was called up by Mario Arteaga to be part of the squad that participated at the 2017 CONCACAF U-17 Championship and subsequently won. He was also called up to participate at the 2017 FIFA U-17 World Cup.

Career statistics

Club

Honours
Mexico U17
CONCACAF U-17 Championship: 2017

References

External links
 
  
 
 

2000 births
Living people
Mexican footballers
Mexico youth international footballers
C.D. Guadalajara footballers
Club Atlético Zacatepec players
Atlético Morelia players
Liga MX players
Footballers from Guadalajara, Jalisco
Association football midfielders
Liga de Expansión MX players
Ascenso MX players